Tang Gonghong (born March 5, 1979, in Fushan, Yantai, Shandong) is a Chinese weightlifter who competed in the 2003 Afro-Asian Games and 2004 Summer Olympics.

She won the gold medal in the over 75 kg class, successfully lifting 182.5 kg (402.37 pounds) in the clean and jerk event.

References
 profile

1979 births
Living people
Olympic gold medalists for China
Olympic weightlifters of China
Sportspeople from Yantai
Weightlifters at the 2004 Summer Olympics
Olympic medalists in weightlifting
Asian Games medalists in weightlifting
Weightlifters from Shandong
Medalists at the 2004 Summer Olympics
Chinese female weightlifters
Asian Games gold medalists for China
Weightlifters at the 2002 Asian Games
Medalists at the 2002 Asian Games
World Weightlifting Championships medalists
20th-century Chinese women
21st-century Chinese women